The Romantic World of Eddy Arnold is a studio album by country music singer Eddy Arnold. It was released in 1968 by RCA Victor.

The album debuted on Billboard magazine's Top Country Albums chart on June 8, 1968, peaked at No. 2, and remained on the chart for a total of 38 weeks. The album included the No. 4 hit, "It's Over".

AllMusic gave the album a rating of two stars.

Track listing
Side A
 "It's Over" (Rodgers)
 "By the Time I Get to Phoenix" (Webb)
 "What Now My Love" (Sigman, Becaud, Delanoe)
 "Can't Take My Eyes off You" (Crewe, Gaudio)
 "Am I That Easy to Forget" (Belew, Stevenson)
 "What a Wonderful World" (Douglas, Weiss)

Side B
 "Honey" (Russell)
 "No Matter Whose Baby You Are" (Chapel)
 "Gentle on My Mind" (Hartford)
 "From This Minute On" (Peters)
 "Evergreen" (Belew, Givens)
 "I Really Go for You" (Chapel)

References

1968 albums
Eddy Arnold albums
RCA Victor albums